This is a list of hotels in the Caribbean.

Geographical note: The Caribbean is a region that consists of the Caribbean Sea, its islands (some surrounded by the Caribbean Sea and some bordering both the Caribbean Sea and the North Atlantic Ocean), and the surrounding coasts. The region is southeast of the Gulf of Mexico and the North American mainland, east of Central America, and north of South America.

Hotels in the Caribbean

Anguilla

 Cap Juluca Hotel, Cap Juluca
 Carimar Beach Club, Mead's Bay, The Valley
 CuisinArt Resort and Spa, Rendezvous Beach
 Ku Resort, Shoal Bay
 Malliouhana Hotel, Mead's Bay, The Valley
 The Viceroy Anguilla, Mead's Bay, The Valley

Aruba

 Amsterdam Manor Beach Resort
 Aruba Bucuti Beach Resort
 Aruba Marriott Resort
 Aruba Millenium Resort
 La Quinta Beach Resort
 Occidental Grand Aruba
 Radisson Aruba Resort, Casino & Spa
 Renaissance Aruba Resort and Casino
 Ritz-Carlton Aruba – opened on November 22, 2013
 Tierra el Sol Aruba Resort

Barbados
 The Fairmont Royal Pavilion in St. James
 The Sandy Lane in St. James

Curaçao
Dreams Curaçao Resort
Plaza Hotel Curaçao

Dominica

 Garraway Hotel

Puerto Rico

Saint Lucia
 Anse Chastanet resort

See also

 List of Caribbean-related topics
 Lists of hotels
 Tourism in the Caribbean

References

Caribbean
Hotels